Group B was one of two groups of the 2017 IIHF World Championship. The four best placed teams advanced to the playoff round, while the last placed team was relegated to Division I in 2018.

Standings

All times are local (UTC+2).

Matches

Finland vs Belarus

Czech Republic vs Canada

Switzerland vs Slovenia

Belarus vs Czech Republic

Norway vs France

Slovenia vs Canada

Finland vs France

Norway vs Switzerland

Belarus vs Canada

Finland vs Czech Republic

Slovenia vs Norway

Switzerland vs France

Switzerland vs Belarus

Finland vs Slovenia

Czech Republic vs Norway

Canada vs France

Czech Republic vs Slovenia

France vs Belarus

Norway vs Finland

Slovenia vs Belarus

Canada vs Switzerland

France vs Czech Republic

Switzerland vs Finland

Canada vs Norway

France vs Slovenia

Belarus vs Norway

Czech Republic vs Switzerland

Canada vs Finland

References

External links
Official website

B